Funda is a commune, with a population of 209,387 (2014), and a town in the Municipality of Cacuaco of Luanda Province, Angola.

It is to the east of the capital city of Luanda.

Transport 
Funda is served by a station on a branch line of the Luanda Railway.

See also 
 
 Railway stations in Angola

References 

Communes in Luanda Province
Populated places in Luanda Province